Jordan's Castle is a former fortified manor house site and possible ringwork castle, located near Wellow, Nottinghamshire, England.

Originally owned by the Foliot family. Jordan Foliot was given license to crenellate his manor in 1264.

Citations

References

Castles in Nottinghamshire